Ola Johansson (born 28 March 1975) is a Swedish former professional footballer who played as a striker for Västra Frölunda in the Allsvenskan. He also won three caps for the Sweden U21 team, helping them reach the quarter-finals of the 1998 UEFA European Under-21 Championship.

References

1975 births
Living people
Swedish footballers
Västra Frölunda IF players
Allsvenskan players
Association football forwards